Thomas Delavall (also spelled Delaval or DeLavall; 1620 – 1682) was a British-born American official and businessman. He was appointed the 2nd, 5th and 11th Mayor of New York City in 1666, 1671 and 1678 respectively.

Born in London, England, Delavall first came to America in 1664 as an officer in Richard Nicolls' army, in which he later accompanied in the Invasion of New York City. Often referred to as "Captain", he had since become a prominent citizen in the community owning a large amount of real estate around the colony, such as houses in New York City and Kingston, along with a mill in Yonkers, and land in Gravesend. Delavall was first appointed Receiver-General of New York City in 1664. He was a member of the Governor's Council of Advisors in 1667, and a judge of the province in 1679.

He was appointed the second mayor of New York City in 1666, succeeding Thomas Willett. He would be reappointed again in 1671, and lastly again in 1678.

Delavall's daughter married William Dervall, another future mayor of the city. Delavall died in 1682 shortly after writing his will.

References

1620 births
1682 deaths
American businesspeople
Mayors of New York City
Businesspeople from London
English army officers
Military personnel from London
English emigrants